The 1885 New York Metropolitans were hard hit as manager/co-owner Jim Mutrie moved over to manage the New York Giants and took several of the team's stars with him. The Metropolitans finished with a 44–64 record, seventh place in the American Association.

Regular season

Season standings

Record vs. opponents

Opening Day lineup

Roster

Player stats

Batting

Starters by position 
Note: Pos = Position; G = Games played; AB = At bats; H = Hits; Avg. = Batting average; HR = Home runs; RBI = Runs batted in

Other batters 
Note: G = Games played; AB = At bats; H = Hits; Avg. = Batting average; HR = Home runs; RBI = Runs batted in

Pitching

Starting pitchers 
Note: G = Games pitched; IP = Innings pitched; W = Wins; L = Losses; ERA = Earned run average; SO = Strikeouts

Relief pitchers 
Note: G = Games pitched; W = Wins; L = Losses; SV = Saves; ERA = Earned run average; SO = Strikeouts

References 

 1885 New York Metropolitans team page at Baseball Reference

New York Metropolitans seasons
New York Metropolitans season
New York Metropolitans season
19th century in Manhattan
Washington Heights, Manhattan